Duke of Somerset, from the county of Somerset, is a title that has been created five times in the peerage of England. It is particularly associated with two families: the Beauforts, who held the title from the creation of 1448, and the Seymours, from the creation of 1547, in whose name the title is still held. The present dukedom is unique, in that the first holder of the title created it for himself in his capacity of Lord Protector of the Kingdom of England, using a power granted in the will of his nephew King Edward VI.

The only subsidiary title of the duke of Somerset is Baron Seymour, which is used as a courtesy title by the eldest son and heir of the duke. This courtesy title is the lowest in rank of all heirs to dukedoms in the peerages of the British Isles, yet the holder's precedence is higher than his title suggests, by virtue of the seniority of the Dukedom of Somerset (the only more senior non-royal duke is the Duke of Norfolk).

Several other titles have been held by the dukes of Somerset, but have become extinct. These include: Earl of Kendal (created 1443, extinct 1444), Earl of Somerset (created 1397, forfeit 1461), Marquess of Dorset (created 1397, degraded 1399; created 1442, forfeit 1461), Marquess of Somerset (created 1397, degraded 1399), Earl of Dorset (created 1441, forfeit 1461), Viscount Rochester (created 1611, extinct 1645), Viscount Beauchamp of Hache (created 1536, forfeit 1552), Earl of Hertford (created 1537, forfeit 1552; and created 1559, extinct 1750), Marquess of Hertford (created 1640, extinct 1675), Baron Seymour of Trowbridge (created 1641, extinct 1750), Baron Percy (created 1722, separated 1750), Baron Cockermouth (created 1749, separated 1750), Earl of Egremont (created 1749, separated 1750), and Earl St. Maur (created 1863, extinct 1885).

The ducal seat is Bradley House in Maiden Bradley, west Wiltshire, with a secondary estate at Berry Pomeroy Castle, Totnes, Devon. The principal burial place for the Seymour family today is All Saints' Church, Maiden Bradley, adjacent to Bradley House; the church and the family cemetery can be reached from the grounds of Bradley House via private access.

Creation of Empress Matilda
William de Mohun of Dunster (?–c. 1155), a favourite of Empress Matilda and a loyal supporter of her in the war against King Stephen (during which he earned the epithet of the "Scourge of the West"), was given the title Earl of Somerset in 1141. In the foundation charter of the priory at Bruton he describes himself as "Willielmus de Moyne, comes Somersetensis". The title was not recognised by Stephen or Henry II (Matilda's son), and his descendants did not use it.

Beaufort creations
 
John Beaufort (1371/1373–1410) was the eldest son from John of Gaunt's marriage to Katherine Swynford. He was created Earl of Somerset on 10 February 1397; on 9 September 1397, following his marriage to Margaret Holland, daughter of Thomas Holland, 2nd Earl of Kent, he was promoted to Marquess of Somerset, and a few weeks later on 29 September 1397 he was created also Marquess of Dorset. However, in 1399, when Henry IV came to the throne, his two marquessates were revoked.

The Commons petitioned the King for his restoration, but Somerset himself objected, stating "the name of marquess is a strange name in this realm". He was succeeded as Earl of Somerset by his son Henry Beaufort (1401–1418), but his early death left the earldom to his brother John Beaufort (1404–1444). He was created Duke of Somerset and Earl of Kendal on 28 August 1443 and died less than a year later on 27 May 1444, perhaps by suicide. The Dukedom of Somerset and Earldom of Kendal became extinct.

The Earldom of Somerset passed to his brother Edmund Beaufort, Count of Mortain (c.1406–1455). Edmund had been created Earl of Dorset on 18 August 1442 and Marquess of Dorset on 24 June 1443. He was created Duke of Somerset under a new creation on 31 March 1448. Despite this, he is usually referred to as the 2nd Duke of Somerset.

The second duke was killed at the First Battle of St Albans on 22 May 1455 and his peerages passed to his son Henry Beaufort (1436–1464) who had been known as the Earl of Dorset since his father's creation as Duke of Somerset. After the defeat at the battle of Towton on 29 March 1461 he fled to Scotland and was attainted on 4 November 1461. All his honours and estates were declared forfeit. His titles were restored to him on 10 March 1463 but he deserted the King and was captured and beheaded after the battle of Hexham on 15 May 1464.

He was unmarried, but his illegitimate son Charles Somerset became the 1st Earl of Worcester. Henry's titles were forfeited by act of Parliament; but his brother Edmund Beaufort (c.1439–1471) was styled Duke of Somerset by the Lancastrians. After the Battle of Tewkesbury on 4 May 1471 he fled and took refuge in Tewkesbury Abbey. He was beheaded by the Yorkists, and buried in the abbey church. Upon his death the house of Beaufort became extinct in the legitimate line.

Royal family creations
In 1499 Henry VII nominated his infant son Edmund to the dukedom of Somerset at his baptism, but the child, just over a year old when he died, was probably never formally created a peer.

The illegitimate son of Henry VIII, Henry Fitzroy, (1519–1536), by Bessie Blount, was created Earl of Nottingham, and Duke of Richmond and Somerset on 18 June 1525. He died without heirs on 22 July 1536 so his titles became extinct.

Earl of Somerset under James VI and I
Robert Carr (c.1590–1645), born Kerr/Ker, son of Sir Thomas Ker of Ferniehirst, became a favourite of King James VI and I. On 25 March 1611 he was created Viscount Rochester, and subsequently a privy councillor. On the death of Lord Salisbury in 1612 he began to act as the king’s secretary. On the 3 November 1613 he was created Earl of Somerset. He died in July 1645, leaving a daughter, Anne. His titles became extinct.

Seymour creation and 17th century claim to revert to Beaufort creations

Edward Seymour, 1st Duke of Somerset (c.1500–1552), was the eldest brother of Jane Seymour, the third wife of King Henry VIII, and was thus the uncle of King Edward VI. Henry had created him Viscount Beauchamp "of Hache" in 1536, at the time of the marriage, and Earl of Hertford in 1537. On the death of Henry VIII on 28 January 1547, Seymour was named in the king's will as one of his sixteen executors who then formed a regency council to rule during the minority of his nine year old son and successor King Edward VI. Seymour was elected head of the Council, which on 1 February 1547 appointed him as "Lord Protector of the Realm and Governor of the King's Person", when he became "the most powerful man in England, a king in all but name" and ruled by proclamation.
On 17 February 1547 the Council created him "Duke of Somerset", which reflected his ancient title as feudal baron of Hatch in Somerset, centred on the manor of Hatch Beauchamp, inherited by his ancestor Roger Seymour (d.c.1361) from his marriage to Cecily Beauchamp (d.1393), the aunt and heiress of John IV de Beauchamp, 3rd Baron Beauchamp (1330-1361). On 10 August 1547 he obtained royal letters patent to bear the augmented coat of arms previously granted in 1536 by Henry VIII to Jane Seymour. Edward Seymour married twice; in about 1535 he divorced his first wife, Catherine Fillol, disowning her and her children, and married Anne Stanhope who bore him nine children. The patent of the dukedom specified that it was to descend to his issue by his second wife Anne Stanhope, thus excluding his eldest son by his first wife from the title, except in case of the failure of male heirs from the junior line. In 1547 he bought Berry Pomeroy Castle in Devon from Sir Thomas Pomeroy,  although he probably never visited it, and it became the seat of his eldest son from his first marriage, Edward Seymour (1527/1535–1593), whose son was made a baronet "of Berry Pomeroy". On the failure of the junior male line in 1750, Sir Edward Seymour, 6th Baronet of Berry Pomeroy became the 8th Duke of Somerset, as the patent allowed, and his descendants, seated at Maiden Bradley House in Wiltshire, continue to bear the title today.

Less than two years after losing his position as Lord Protector, his titles were forfeited and he was beheaded on 22 January 1552. He was replaced in the minority government of Edward VI by John Dudley, Duke of Northumberland, whose pragmatic style contrasted with Seymour's mixture of idealism and arrogance.

In 1644 Charles I granted the earldom of Glamorgan to Edward Somerset (1613–1667). He was a descendant of Charles Somerset, the illegitimate son of Henry Beaufort, 3rd Duke of Somerset. In return for obtaining military help from Ireland he promised Edward the title of Duke of Somerset. Under the Commonwealth Edward was banished from England and his estates were seized. At the Restoration his estates were restored, and he claimed the dukedom of Somerset as promised to him by Charles I. However, this claim was rejected by the House of Lords, and so was the title of Earl of Glamorgan. This enabled King Charles II to restore the ducal title to the fourth creation family, the Seymours, who descend from the country's de facto regent, the lord protector in 1547.

Edward Seymour (1538–1621) was son and heir of Edward Seymour, 1st Duke of Somerset, from his second marriage. He was created the Earl of Hertford in 1559 under Elizabeth I. His grandson William Seymour (1588—1660) secretly married Lady Arbella Stuart (1575–1615) on 22 June 1610. She was the niece of Lord Darnley, a Stuart, first cousin of James I and bar for James's children next in succession to Scottish and English thrones. Both William and Arabella were imprisoned but managed to escape. William fled to Paris, but Arbella was recaptured. She was imprisoned in the Tower of London where she died in 1615. William returned to England shortly after her death and inherited his father's titles in 1621. Charles I received his support and made him Marquess of Hertford in 1640 and on 13 September 1660, shortly before his death on 24 October, the title of Duke of Somerset was restored to him as its legitimate heir, following its non-existence for 108 years. He outlived his three eldest sons and as the dukedom descends to heirs male of the holder of the 1547 grant it passed to William Seymour (1654–1671) who was the son of the third son mentioned (lived 1626–1654). The 3rd duke died unmarried and the title passed to John Seymour (bef. 1646–1675) the last surviving son of the 2nd Duke, his uncle. On his death without issue on 29 April 1675 only the Marquessate of Hertford became extinct. His distant cousin Francis Seymour, 3rd Baron Seymour of Trowbridge (1658–1678) became 5th Duke of Somerset. Francis was the eldest surviving son of Charles Seymour (1621–1665), whose father Sir Francis Seymour (c. 1590–1664), a younger brother of the 2nd Duke of Somerset, had been created Baron Seymour of Trowbridge in 1641.

When the 5th Duke died unmarried in 1678, the title passed to his brother, Charles Seymour (1662–1748), youngest son of the 2nd Baron Trowbridge. The 6th Duke, known as "the Proud Duke", was a favourite of Queen Anne. He first married Lady Elizabeth Percy, daughter of Joceline Percy, 11th Earl of Northumberland (1644–1670). She died in 1722 and in 1725 he married Lady Charlotte Finch (1711–1773), daughter of Daniel Finch, 2nd Earl of Nottingham. The 6th duke died 2 December 1748, at Petworth House, Sussex at age 86 leaving the title to his son from his first marriage Algernon Seymour (1684–1750).

Later subsidiary titles
Algernon had been created Baron Percy in 1722. After succeeding his father as 7th Duke of Somerset he was created Earl of Northumberland in 1749, the Earldom of Northumberland having become extinct with the death of his maternal grandfather in 1670. The remainder of the earldom was to pass to Sir Hugh Smithson, husband of Algernon's daughter Elizabeth Seymour (bef. 1730–1776), whilst the titles Baron Cockermouth and Earl of Egremont were remaindered to the children of his sister, Lady Catherine Seymour (1693–1731). Without male issue, on his death in February 1750 these titles therefore passed to different families in accordance with the remainders in the patents of their creation. The earldom of Hertford, the barony of Beauchamp, and the barony of Seymour of Trowbridge became extinct; and the dukedom of Somerset, together with the barony of Seymour, devolved on his distant cousin.

Later descent
Sir Edward Seymour, 6th baronet of Berry Pomeroy (1694–1757) became the 8th Duke of Somerset in 1750. The 1st baronet was (Sir) Edward Seymour (1556–1613), son of Edward Seymour (1527/1535–1593) who was the 1st Duke's eldest son and of Catherine Seymour (née Filliol). He was a seventh-generation descendant of the 1st Duke. The 4th Baronet had been speaker of the House of Commons during the reign of Charles II and he moved the family home from Berry Pomeroy Castle in Devon to Bradley House in Maiden Bradley.

Upon this Duke's death he was succeeded by his eldest son Edward Seymour (1717–1792). He died unmarried and was succeeded by his brother Webb Seymour (1718–1793) who became the 10th Duke. His son Edward Adolphus Seymour (1775–1855) was a noted mathematician and became the 11th Duke upon his father's death. He changed the family name to St. Maur, but Seymour was still very often used.

12th Duke and sons, the Earls St. Maur

The 11th Duke was succeeded by his eldest son Edward Adolphus Seymour (1804–1885) who was created Earl St. Maur, of Berry Pomeroy in 1863. His eldest son who predeceased him Edward A. F. Seymour (1835–1869) was known as Lord Seymour until 1863 as a courtesy title he adopted Earl St. Maur. Commonly known as Ferdy, he was an adventurer who joined Garibaldi's army under the assumed name of Capt. Richard Sarsfield. In 1866 he began a relationship with a 17-year-old maid called Rosina Swan. The Earl took Rosina with him during his travels, returning to England with her in 1868 to live near Brighton. Ferdy and Rosina had two children; a girl named Ruth (1867–1953) was born whilst the couple were in Tangier and a boy named Richard 'Harold' St. Maur (1869–1927) was born in Brighton shortly before the death of his father. Had the Earl married Rosina, Harold would have been the heir to his grandfather's dukedom and for this reason Harold tried to find proof that the couple had married whilst they were living in the Netherlands, offering reward of £50 (equal to about £ today) for evidence to support the claim, but was unsuccessful.

13th–19th dukes
The 12th Duke died on 28 December 1885 aged 81 outliving both of his sons with no legitimate male heirs and the title passed to his aged unmarried brother Archibald Henry Algernon Seymour (1810–1891); when he died a few years later, the youngest brother Algernon Percy Banks St. Maur (1813–1894) became the 14th Duke. Three and a half years later he was dead. His son Algernon Seymour (1846–1923) became the 15th Duke. 

He died without children and the title passed to his distant cousin Edward Hamilton Seymour (1860–1931), great-great-grandson of Lord Francis Seymour, Dean of Wells (1726–1799), youngest son of the 8th Duke. He was succeeded by his son Evelyn Francis Seymour (1882–1954) who passed the title on to his son Percy Hamilton Seymour (1910–1984). The title is currently held by his son John Michael Edward Seymour who was born in 1952. The current heir to the title is Sebastian Seymour, Lord Seymour who was born in 1982.

Arms

Earls of Somerset, first creation (1141)
William de Mohun of Dunster, 1st Earl of Somerset (d. c.1155) whose descendants have never claimed the title

Earls of Somerset, second creation (1397)
John Beaufort, 1st Earl of Somerset (1371/1373–1410), eldest legitimated son of John of Gaunt, 1st Duke of Lancaster

Marquesses of Somerset (1397)
John Beaufort, 1st Marquess of Somerset, 1st Marquess of Dorset (1371/1373–1410) was created Marquess later the same year for his role as a counter-appellant

Earls of Somerset, second creation (1397; reverted)
 John Beaufort, 1st Earl of Somerset (c. 1373–1410) lost his marquessates when Henry IV acceded in 1399
 Henry Beaufort, 2nd Earl of Somerset (1401–1418), eldest son of the 1st Earl
 John Beaufort, 3rd Earl of Somerset, 1st Duke of Somerset (1404–1444), brother of preceding, created Duke of Somerset in 1443 (see below)
 Edmund Beaufort, 4th Earl of Somerset (c. 1406–1455), brother of preceding, raised to a dukedom in 1448 (see below)

Dukes of Somerset, first creation (1443)
 John Beaufort, 1st Duke of Somerset (1404–1444) died without male issue, when his dukedom became extinct

Dukes of Somerset, second creation (1448)
Often numbered 2nd – 4th to include John, the brother of the Edmund, whose title was nonetheless technically extinct
 Edmund Beaufort, 2nd Duke of Somerset (c. 1406–1455) became Duke of Somerset in 1448
 Henry Beaufort, 3rd Duke of Somerset (1436–1464), eldest son of Edmund, whose titles were forfeit from 1461 to 1463
 Edmund Beaufort, 4th Duke of Somerset (c. 1438–1471), second son of Edmund, may or may not be considered Duke, but was so styled by Lancastrians (see article for details)

Duke of Somerset, third creation (1499)
Edmund Tudor, 1st Duke of Somerset (1499–1500), third son of Henry VII, died in infancy

Duke of Richmond and Somerset (1525)
Henry FitzRoy, 1st Duke of Richmond and Somerset (1519–1536), illegitimate son of Henry VIII, died without issue

Dukes of Somerset, fourth creation (1547)
Edward Seymour, 1st Duke of Somerset (c. 1500–1552), uncle to and Lord Protector of Edward VI, was deposed and executed and his titles forfeit in 1552.

Earls of Somerset, third creation (1613)
Robert Carr, 1st Earl of Somerset (c.1590–1645), a favourite of James VI & I, died without issue

Dukes of Somerset, fourth creation restored (1660)
William Seymour, 2nd Duke of Somerset (1588–1660), great-grandson of the 1st Duke through the 1st Duke's third son, Edward Seymour, 1st Earl of Hertford, and a Cavalier, was rewarded with restoration to the dukedom soon after the Stuart Restoration
William Seymour, Lord Beauchamp (1621–1642), eldest son of the 2nd Duke, predeceased his father unmarried
Robert Seymour, Lord Beauchamp (1622–1646), second son of the 2nd Duke, predeceased his father unmarried
Henry Seymour, Lord Beauchamp (1626–1654), third son of the 2nd Duke, predeceased his father
William Seymour, 3rd Duke of Somerset (1650–1671), only son of Henry Seymour, Lord Beauchamp, died without issue
John Seymour, 4th Duke of Somerset (bef. 1646–1675), fourth and youngest son of the 2nd Duke, died without issue
Francis Seymour, 5th Duke of Somerset (1658–1678), great-grandson of Edward Seymour, Viscount Beauchamp through the Lords Seymour of Trowbridge; himself eldest son of the 1st Duke's fourth son; Edward Seymour, 1st Earl of Hertford; died without issue
Charles Seymour, 6th Duke of Somerset (1662–1748), "The Proud Duke", younger brother of the 5th Duke
Algernon Seymour, 7th Duke of Somerset (1684–1750), eldest son of the 6th Duke
George Seymour, Viscount Beauchamp (1725–1744), only son of the 7th Duke, predeceased his father without issue
Edward Seymour, 8th Duke of Somerset (1695–1757), great-great-great-grandson of Sir Edward Seymour, 1st Baronet of the Seymour Baronets of Berry Pomeroy; himself only son of the 1st Duke’s second son having male issue; Sir Edward Seymour, of Berry Pomeroy
Edward Seymour, 9th Duke of Somerset (1717–1792), eldest son of the 8th Duke
Webb Seymour, 10th Duke of Somerset (1718–1793), second son of the 8th Duke
Edward Adolphus St Maur, 11th Duke of Somerset (1775–1855), only son of the 10th Duke
Edward Adolphus Seymour, 12th Duke of Somerset (1804–1885), eldest son of the 11th Duke
Edward Adolphus Ferdinand Seymour, Earl St Maur (1835–1869), eldest son of the 12th Duke, predeceased his father without legitimate issue
Archibald Algernon Henry Seymour, 13th Duke of Somerset (1810–1891), second son of the 11th Duke, died without issue
Algernon Percy Banks St Maur, 14th Duke of Somerset (1813–1894), third and youngest son of the 11th Duke
Algernon St Maur, 15th Duke of Somerset (1846–1923), eldest son of the 14th Duke, died without issue
Edward Hamilton Seymour, 16th Duke of Somerset (1860–1931), great-great-grandson of the Very Reverend Lord Francis Seymour, fourth and youngest son of the 8th Duke
Evelyn Francis Edward Seymour, 17th Duke of Somerset (1882–1954), only son of the 16th Duke
Francis William Seymour (1906–1907), eldest son of the 17th Duke, died in infancy
Algernon Francis Edward Seymour (1908–1911), second son of the 17th Duke, died young
Percy Hamilton Seymour, 18th Duke of Somerset (1910–1984), third and youngest son of the 17th Duke
John Michael Edward Seymour, 19th Duke of Somerset (b. 1952), eldest son of the 18th Duke
The heir apparent is the present holder's eldest son Sebastian Edward Seymour, Lord Seymour (b. 1982).

Earls St Maur (1863 creation)
Edward Adolphus Seymour, 12th Duke of Somerset, 1st Earl St Maur (1804–1885) was created Earl St Maur (pronounced "Seemer") in the peerage of the United Kingdom when already Duke of Somerset, in order to provide a more senior courtesy title for his heir.
Edward Adolphus Ferdinand Seymour, Earl St Maur (1835–1869), the eldest son of the 12th Duke, in the event was the only man called "Earl St Maur," as he and his younger brother both died unmarried. In 1885, when the Dukedom reverted to his uncle, the earldom became extinct.

Succession to the Dukedom

 Percy Seymour, 18th Duke of Somerset (1910–1984)
 John Seymour, 19th Duke of Somerset (b. 1952)
(1). Sebastian Edward, Lord Seymour (b. 1982)
(2). Lord Charles Thomas George Seymour (b. 1992)
(3). Lord Francis Charles Edward Seymour (b. 1956)
(4). Webb Edward Percy Seymour (b. 1990)

After those in the above immediate line of succession, the Marquess of Hertford and his legitimate male heirs and relations in the senior male line of the Seymour dynasty are next in line to the dukedom.

Family tree

See also
Duchess of Somerset
Marquess of Hertford
Baron Alcester
Seymour Baronets
Somerset House, Park Lane

References

 
Dukedoms in the Peerage of England
!
Noble titles created in 1443
Noble titles created in 1448
Noble titles created in 1499
Noble titles created in 1547